The Fraternity Years is a retrospective album that has been released in CD format.  As the name implies, the album collects most of the music from the many singles that Mouse and the Traps released on Fraternity Records, so the last two singles released by the band in 1969 on Bell Records are omitted, as is the novelty song "Would You Believe" and the cover of "Psychotic Reaction" by Positively 13 O'clock.  However, the album includes 7 previously unreleased songs.

Release data

This album was released as a CD by Ace Records/Big Beat Records in 1997 as #CDWIKD 171.

Track listing 
All tracks credited to Mouse and the Traps unless otherwise noted

 A Public Execution (Henderson, Weiss), 2:49; by Mouse
 Maid of Sugar, Maid of Spice (Henderson, Weiss), 2:40
 Nobody Cares (Fouts, Weiss), 2:44
 Cryin' Inside (Stanley, Weiss), 2:33
 I'm a Man (Ellas McDaniel), 2:25
 Lie Beg Borrow & Steal (Weiss), 2:35
 I've Got Her Love (Barton, Brians), 2:15; by Chris St. John
 I am the One (Barton, Brians), 2:26
 Like I Know You Do (Henderson, Weiss), 2:25
 Sometimes You Just Can't Win (Brians, Henderson), 2:57
 All for You (Henderson, Weiss), 2:47; by Mouse
 Do the Best You Can (Brians), 2:25
 Look at the Sun (Gillespie), 2:41
 You Don't Love Me (You Don't Care) (Cobbs), 2:09
 Promises Promises (Brians, Payne), 2:24
 I Satisfy (Stanley, Weiss), 3:47
 Requiem for Sarah (Stanley, Weiss), 3:19
 L.O.V.E. Love (Henderson, Weiss), 2:31
 Ya Ya (Dorsey, Levy, Lewis, Robinson), 1:57
 Good Times (Stanley, Weiss), 2:31
 Hand in Hand (Stanley), 1:59
 You Are My Sunshine (Davis, Mitchell), 2:23
 I Wonder Where the Birds Fly, 1:57
 Mohair Sam (Dallas Frazier), 2:14
 As Far as the Sea (Barton, Brians), 2:39; by Chris St. John

1997 compilation albums
Mouse and the Traps albums